Andrews County Airport , is located in Andrews, Texas, United States.

Facilities and aircraft

Andrews County Airport is situated on 260 acres in Andrews, Texas, 1-mile northeast of the central business district, and contains three runways and one helipad.  The longest runway is 16/34, is paved with asphalt measuring 5,816 x 75 ft (1773 x 23 m). A second runway, 11/29, also paved with asphalt, measures 2,939 x 75 ft (896 x 23 m).  The airport's helipad measures 25 x 25 ft (8 x 8 m).

For the 12-month period ending July 7, 2008, the airport had 3,600 aircraft operations, an average of 69 per week: 67% local general aviation, and 33% transient general aviation. At that time there were 21 aircraft based at this airport: 73% single-engine and 14% multi-engine, 5% jet, 5% helicopter, and 5% ultra-light.

Andrews County Airport has one certified instrument approach procedure (IAP): An RNAV (GPS).

References

Airports in Texas
Texas
Airports
Transportation in Andrews County, Texas
Buildings and structures in Andrews County, Texas